Kotipelto is a Finnish power metal self-named band by Timo Kotipelto, created during a hiatus in activity for power metal band Stratovarius. Kotipelto has been commercially well received in their native Finland, with a top 10 single "Beginning" from his first release Waiting for the Dawn, and lyrics often concentrating on ancient Egyptian themes.

Discography

Albums 
2002: Waiting for the Dawn
2004: Coldness
2007: Serenity

Singles 
2002: "Beginning"
2004: "Reasons"
2004: "Take Me Away"
2006: "Sleep Well"

Members 
Timo Kotipelto

Guest musicians 
On Waiting for the Dawn
Michael Romeo – guitars
Roland Grapow – guitars
Jari Kainulainen – bass
Sami Virtanen – guitar
Mikko Härkin – keyboard
Janne Wirman – keyboards
Mirka Rantanen – drums
Gas Lipstick – drums

On Coldness
Michael Romeo – guitars
Jari Kainulainen – bass
Janne Wirman – keyboards
Mirka Rantanen – drums
Juhani Malmberg – guitars

On Serenity
Tuomas Wäinölä – guitars
Lauri Porra – bass
Janne Wirman – keyboards
Mirka Rantanen – drums

See also 
Stratovarius

External links 
Kotipelto's website

Finnish power metal musical groups
Heavy metal supergroups
Century Media Records artists
Musical groups established in 2001